Tartuffe (Herr Tartüff) is a German silent film produced by Erich Pommer for UFA and released in 1926. It was directed by F. W. Murnau, photographed by Karl Freund and written by Carl Mayer from Molière's original play. It was shot at the Tempelhof Studios in Berlin. Set design and costumes were by Robert Herlth and Walter Röhrig.

The film starred Emil Jannings as Tartuffe, Lil Dagover as Elmire and Werner Krauss as Orgon.

Based on the play Tartuffe, the film retains the basic plot, but Murnau and Mayer pared down Molière's play, eliminating most of the secondary characters and concentrating on the triangle of Orgon, Elmire and Tartuffe. They also introduced a framing device, whereby the story of Tartuffe becomes a film-within-a-film, shown by a young actor as a device to warn his grandfather about his unctuous but evil housekeeper.

Cast

Restoration and home video
Like all Murnau's surviving films, Tartuffe is licensed by the Friedrich Wilhelm Murnau Foundation, whose tinted restoration is distributed on home video with a piano score by Javier Pérez de Azpeitia. It has been released on DVD in the US (Kino Lorber) and in identical editions in the UK (Eureka/Masters of Cinema), France (mk2), Germany (Universum Film) and Spain (Divisa). The FWMS restoration has also been released on Blu-ray in the UK by Eureka/MoC.

In 2015, a new, longer and more accurate restoration with a full orchestral score was broadcast on Arte television, and as of April 2020 it is available on home video only in the U.S. via Kino Lorber’s Blu-ray reissue.

Legacy
In retrospective reviews, critics commented on the film's mise-en-scene and praised the performances.  Several critics noted the rarity of a comedy directed by Murnau, who was famous for the expressionist dramas. Its humorous storyline and happy ending has rendered it a minor work in Murnau's filmography and has led film critic Jonathan Rosenbaum to call it "underrated."

See also
1926 in film
List of comedy films of the 1920s
List of drama films of the 1920s
List of UFA films

References

External links

1926 films
1926 comedy-drama films
German comedy-drama films
Films of the Weimar Republic
German silent feature films
Films directed by F. W. Murnau
Films with screenplays by Carl Mayer
German black-and-white films
Films based on works by Molière
German films based on plays
German Expressionist films
Films produced by Erich Pommer
UFA GmbH films
Films shot at Tempelhof Studios
Works based on Tartuffe
Silent comedy-drama films
1920s German films
1920s German-language films